Invincible is an adult animated superhero television series created by Robert Kirkman for Amazon Prime Video and premiered on March 25, 2021. Based on the Image Comics series of the same name by Kirkman, Cory Walker, and Ryan Ottley, the show follows 17-year-old Mark Grayson and his transformation into a superhero under the guidance of his father, Omni-Man, the most powerful superhero on the planet. During his transformation, Mark finds himself struggling between his personal life and superhero duties, where he will be forced to prove that he can be the hero that his father is. The series stars Steven Yeun, Sandra Oh, and J. K. Simmons as the Grayson family, while the rest of the cast serve as recurring characters.

Following its release, the series received widespread acclaim from critics and audiences, with praise for its animation, action sequences, storyline, writing, voice acting, and faithfulness to the comics. In April 2021, ahead of season one's finale, Amazon renewed the series for a second and third season. Season two is set to be released in late 2023.

Premise
Mark Grayson is a seemingly normal teenager, except for the fact that his father, Nolan, is the most powerful superhero on the planet, and that shortly after his seventeenth birthday, Mark begins to develop powers of his own and learns how to wield them with help from his father.

Characters

Main
 Mark Grayson / Invincible (voiced by Steven Yeun): The eponymous main character. After gaining his powers at 17 years old, Mark discovers the harsh realities of being a superhero while struggling to define himself. He is shown to have a berserker side when fighting the Flaxans and Machine Head's villains, revealed to be a Viltrumite trait.
 Debbie Grayson (voiced by Sandra Oh): Mark's mother and Nolan's wife. Debbie is an experienced realtor, once long adjusted to being a superhero's spouse, before entering into a drunken spiral of depression during the end of the first season.
 Nolan Grayson / Omni-Man (voiced by J. K. Simmons): Mark's Viltrumite father and Debbie's husband. Born on the planet Viltrum to a superpowered alien race, his parents died in his youth before he joined the Viltrum Empire's intergalactic expansion several thousand years ago. After arriving on Earth 20 years before the series, Nolan is considered the most powerful superhero on the planet, with a civilian identity of a rich travel writer.

Recurring
 Samantha Eve Wilkins / Atom Eve (voiced by Gillian Jacobs): A matter/energy manipulating superheroine. Formerly a member of the Teen Team and new Guardians rosters, she quits after her ex-boyfriend Rex Splode cheats on her with Dupli-Kate. Struggling to find self-meaning, she chooses to help people directly with humanitarian actions.
 William Clockwell (voiced by Andrew Rannells): Mark's best friend and civilian confidant.
 Global Defense Agency: A clandestine organization that organizes global superhero responses and utilizes advanced technology in expediting their recovery or resuscitation after death.
 Cecil Stedman (voiced by Walton Goggins): Director of the GDA who possesses a long-range personal teleporter and inducts Invincible at the start of his hero career. He is implied to have a history with Damien Darkblood.
 Donald Ferguson (voiced by Chris Diamantopoulos): A high-ranking GDA agent who serves directly under Cecil Stedman and is in charge of overseeing the secret projects meant to incapacitate or kill Nolan, only to die in a massive explosion in a futile attempt to kill Nolan.
 Guardians of the Globe (new roster): Heroes who were formerly of the Teen Team merged with other experienced heroes with diverse skill sets.
 Rudolph "Rudy" Connors / Robot (voiced by Zachary Quinto and Ross Marquand): A deformed individual who operates a series of robotic drones and has a sizable personal fortune. He has a condition where outside air burns his lungs, forcing him to live in a pod to survive. Using "Robot", Connors formerly led the Teen Team before creating a new Guardians roster. He also uses Rex Splode's DNA and the Mauler Twins' expertise in cloning to make a new body for himself. Quinto voices the character in his Robot form and human form while Marquand voices the clone version.
 Rex Sloan / Rex Splode (voiced by Jason Mantzoukas): An incorrigible superhero who can charge potential energy into anything he touches to create explosives and a former member of the Teen Team who is selected to join the new Guardians roster. Sloan shows some maturity after Omni-Man's public betrayal, growing closer to the team.
 Kate Cha / Dupli-Kate (voiced by Malese Jow): A self-replicating superheroine, formerly of the Teen Team, before she is selected to join the new Guardians roster. All Kates are numbered, which decreases in losses so that whichever remains with "1" is the prime Kate. She also has a telepathic link with her doubles, which causes her to feel what they feel.
 Shrinking Rae (voiced by Grey Griffin): A size-manipulating superheroine selected to join the new Guardians roster. Her name is a reference to the Shrink Ray device. She is one of the few characters from the comics to be gender-swapped.
 Amanda / Monster Girl (voiced by Grey Griffin and Kevin Michael Richardson): A cursed superheroine whose powers allow her to transform into a powerful masculine-like ogre. She begins the series chronologically at 24 years old but is physically at age 12 due to her powers making her younger with each use.
 Markus Grimshaw / Black Samson (voiced by Khary Payton): An original Guardian from the team's early days who left after losing his powers. Donning an armored super-suit to continue as a hero, he joins the new roster as the veteran voice. After being hospitalized by Battle Beast, his powers return to accelerate his recovery and he shelves his armor.
 Amber Bennett (voiced by Zazie Beetz): Mark's classmate and girlfriend. She was redesigned from her comic book source with a resemblance to her voice actress for the series. She is depicted with an insight to her, deducing Mark's identity before he tells her.
 The Mauler Twins (both voiced by Kevin Michael Richardson): Two blue-skinned, hyper-powerful, super-genius superhumans and long-time adversaries of the original Guardians. Despite their name, they are not actual twins but rather clones of each other. Both proclaim to be the original while stating the other is a clone.
 Art Rosenbaum (voiced by Mark Hamill): A superhero suit tailor and long-time friend to many superheroes, mainly Omni-Man.
 Damien Darkblood (voiced by Clancy Brown): A demon detective who escaped Hell to seek justice for others and save his soul, whose presence triggers a sudden cold in the ambient temperature. Cecil exiles him back to Hell to prevent him from exposing Nolan too early as a criminal.

Guest
 Allen the Alien (voiced by Seth Rogen): An assessor of member world candidates for the Coalition of Planets whose homeworld was conquered by the Viltrumites. He initially has a scuffle with Invincible near the Moon's orbit, but realizes that he mistakenly went to Earth when he was supposed to travel to the planet Urath.
 Kill Cannon (voiced by Fred Tatasciore): A supervillain armed with an arm-mounted laser cannon whom Mark defeated.
 Steve (voiced by Jon Hamm): A Secret Service agent who guards the White House's front gate.
 Matt (voiced by Max Burkholder): Steve's stepson.
 Guardians of the Globe (original roster): A decades-old superhero team massacred by Omni-Man. Afterwards, a new roster is created.
 The Immortal (voiced by Ross Marquand): The millennia-old leader of the Guardians who was once a Celtic warrior before he was exposed to a cosmic anomaly and went on to fight in the Crusades and become Abraham Lincoln. The Maulers later revive him to fight Robot and the New Guardians, but the Immortal goes to fight Omni-Man instead. While the Immortal is subsequently defeated, he recovers in the GDA's custody.
 Holly / War Woman (voiced by Lauren Cohan): A powerful ancient warrior and co-benefactor of the Guardians whom Nolan killed.
 Alana / Green Ghost (voiced by Sonequa Martin-Green): A superheroine encased in a green suit with ghost-like powers whom Nolan killed. She is one of the few characters from the comics to be gender swapped.
 Martian Man (voiced by Chad Coleman): An exiled, shapeshifting Martian superhero whom Nolan killed.
 Josef / Red Rush (voiced by Michael Cudlitz) A Russian speedster and the team's first responder whom Nolan killed.
 Darkwing (voiced by Lennie James): A gadget-wielding caped crusader and co-benefactor of the Guardians whom Nolan killed.
 Aquarus (voiced by Ross Marquand): A hydrokinetic, piscine humanoid and king of an underwater nation whom Nolan killed.
 Connie (voiced by Mae Whitman): War Woman's co-worker and business partner in the heroine's civilian identity.
 Principal Winslow (voiced by Reginald VelJohnson): Mark's high school principal.
 Doc Seismic (voiced by Chris Diamantopoulos): An earthquake-generating mad scientist who holds socially progressive views towards the U.S. government and its past leaders.
 Bi-Plane (voiced by Ross Marquand): A flight suit-empowered supervillain who attempted to destroy Denver, only to be thrown into space by the Immortal.
 Kursk (voiced by Ross Marquand): A Russian electrokinetic supervillain.
 Titan (voiced by Mahershala Ali): A criminal enforcer who can manifest regenerative stone armor at will. He and his family live in poverty and feels looked down on by superheroes. He later becomes a crime lord after his boss, Machine Head, is arrested and works to protect people that are overlooked by superheroes.
 The Flaxans: A warrior race of aliens who capture slaves from other dimensions. They seek to conquer Earth despite three failed attempts and Omni-Man attacking their planet.
 Slash (voiced by Djimon Hounsou): The leader who aims to kill Invincible for scarring him and conquer Earth before he is killed by Omni-Man.
 Olga (voiced by Grey Griffin): Red Rush's widow. She moves back to Moscow following his death. 
 Martian Emperor (voiced by Djimon Hounsou): The ruler of Mars who quarantines the planet to isolate the parasitic Sequids from the rest of the universe.
 Vanessa (voiced by Nicole Byer): Titan's wife.
 Fiona (voiced by Nicole Byer): Titan's daughter.
 Machine Head (voiced by Jeffrey Donovan): A cyborg crime lord with an auto-tuned voice, extensive illicit funding, and Titan's former boss. Currently in GDA custody.
 Tether Tyrant (voiced by Reginald VelJohnson): A supervillain hired by Machine Head.
 Battle Beast (voiced by Michael Dorn): A space-faring leonine alien warrior seeking to find worthy opponents to fight.
 D.A. Sinclair (voiced by Ezra Miller): A mad scientist with an obsession for "improving" humanity. After his tech overwhelms Invincible, Cecil Stedman hires Sinclair to mass-produce zombie cyborg super soldiers, or "Reanimen", to fight Omni-Man and counter the Viltrumites' impending invasion.

 Rick Sheridan (voiced by Jonathan Groff): William's love interest who is kidnapped and converted into a Reaniman.
 Adam Wilkins (voiced by Fred Tatasciore): Eve's father who vocally disapproves of her being a superhero.
 Mrs. Wilkins (voiced by Grey Griffin): A soft-spoken woman who acts as a buffer between her husband and daughter.
 Doug Cheston (voiced by Justin Roiland): A student at Upstate University who is kidnapped and converted into a Reaniman. He commits suicide after a fight with Invincible.
 Kyle (voiced by Khary Payton): A nerdy frat-boy who befriends Amber at Upstate.

Episodes

Production

Development
On April 4, 2017, it was announced that a film about Invincible was being developed by Universal Pictures. It was also revealed that Evan Goldberg and Seth Rogen would be the directors of the film after their collaboration on the AMC TV series Preacher. It was also revealed that the film would be rated R, to keep its faithfulness to the comic series. Skybound Entertainment and Point Grey Pictures would be producing the film. However, when the series was announced, the film remained in hiatus, until on January 26, 2021, it was revealed that the film was still in development and would exist separately from the series.

On August 11, 2017, Robert Kirkman signed a deal with Amazon to develop various series for Amazon Prime Video, with his company Skybound Entertainment. However, it was revealed that series that are already in production or development with other studios, will not be developed for Amazon. Kirkman revealed that he was interested on developing a series of the Invincible comic series, but that would not be possible at the moment because Universal was developing a film based on the comic series. Kirkman commented: "At Skybound Entertainment we strive to tell the best stories in the most unique and creative ways in an effort to always break new ground. A forward thinking company like Amazon is the perfect home for us. Sharon Tal Yguado has been an instrumental force in the success of The Walking Dead and Outcast from day one. Being able to not only continue that relationship, but also expand it into new territory with the vast resources of Amazon, means great things are ahead for myself, David Alpert, Skybound, and fans of awesome entertainment."

However, on June 19, 2018, it was announced that Amazon had given a series order to the project for a first season consisting of eight episodes. It was also revealed that the series would be animated and its episodes would be hourlong. Simon Racioppa serves as showrunner for the series and also serves as executive producer alongside Kirkman, David Alpert, and Catherine Winder. Production companies involved with the series include Skybound. Coincidentally, executive producers Evan Goldberg and Seth Rogen (who also provides a voice on the show) are working on a live-action film adaptation of the comic, which is separate from the animated series, as co-directors, writers, and producers. On April 29, 2021, after the release of the final episode of the first season, Amazon renewed the series for a second and third season.

Casting 
On January 31, 2019, the cast of the series was revealed, with Steven Yeun to portray Mark Grayson / Invincible and J. K. Simmons portraying Nolan Grayson / Omni-Man. Sandra Oh, Mark Hamill, Seth Rogen, Gillian Jacobs, Andrew Rannells, Zazie Beetz, Walton Goggins, Jason Mantzoukas, Mae Whitman, Chris Diamantopoulos, Malese Jow, Kevin Michael Richardson, Grey Griffin and Max Burkholder also joined the cast of the series. On July 18, 2020, Robert Kirkman confirmed the casting in a live video on Twitter.

Animation and title sequence
When the show was confirmed to be animated, it was confirmed that Wind Sun Sky Entertainment and its partner company, Skybound North, would be co-producing and animating the series. Catherine Winder, CEO and partner at Wind Sun Sky, commented: "We typically focus on creator-driven content for the global marketplace. There's nothing we love more than to partner with strong creative voices and visionaries around which we can build franchises."

The series title sequence is recognized by appearing right where a character would have said "Invincible" for the first time at each episode. However, the title sequence also becomes bloodier with each episode. Invincible's creator Robert Kirkman revealed that he wanted to represent the dark days that lie ahead by using the increasingly bloody title cards. Simon Racioppa revealed that he wanted each episode to be different from the previous ones to convince the audience to not skip it.

Music
On December 2, 2020, it was revealed that John Paesano would be composing the score to the series.

Release
After Amazon ordered the first season of the series, it was confirmed that the series would be consisting of eight episodes. On January 22, 2021, during a live-stream celebrating the 18th anniversary of Invincible #1, Kirkman revealed that the series would debut on March 25, 2021 (midnight EST), with the first 3 episodes. The remaining episodes would release weekly thereafter. On January 20, 2023, it was announced that season 2 will debut in late 2023.

Reception
The review aggregator website Rotten Tomatoes reported a 98% approval rating for the first season based on 86 critic reviews. The website's critical consensus reads, "With bold animation, bloody action, and an all-star cast led by the charming Steven Yeun, Invincible smartly adapts its source material without sacrificing its nuanced perspective on the price of superpowers." Metacritic reported a score of 73 out of 100 based on 16 critics, indicating "generally favorable reviews" for the first season.

Ben Travers of IndieWire gave the show a B grade, stating that "Kirkman's adaptation is provocative, surprising, and sometimes challenging, as it constantly tries to disrupt the accepted ideas of its genre, whether that's the superhero genre, the teen drama genre, or the misguided notion that animation is a genre unto itself." Kathryn VanArendonk of Vulture states "the series has a palpable 'more of an eight-hour movie' thing going on, and the potential of that model is that it will all coalesce in the end into this glorious, big, transfixing story" but also adds that "the pitfall is that it makes these opening episodes a little weaker; there are so many characters happening here, so many story threads to put in place, that it's hard to know what to invest in as a viewer." Caroline Framke from Variety commented: "Now, of course, Kirkman is the wildly successful co-creator and executive producer of 'The Walking Dead,' so even those who might not have picked up an 'Invincible' comic might be interested in this spry, hourlong animated series that somehow manages to be both snarky and earnest within the same breath." William Hughes from The A.V. Club praised the series for its animation and stated: "Funny, exciting, and emotionally smart—seriously, Sandra Oh is killing it here—Invincible isn't bulletproof. But, like its increasingly burdened hero, it's trying. And sometimes, in the superhero game, that's all you can really do." Bob Strauss from Datebook praised the show, commenting: "While you can’t describe 'Invincible' as gritty, it does feel like the right kind of animated super-show for an era marked by Zack Snyder’s dark-hued 'Justice League' reconstruction and Amazon’s own, ultra-pathological take on the genre, 'The Boys.' It’s as clean-looking as any program we grew up with, but it has the dirtier stuff we secretly wanted."

Siddhant Adlakha of IGN gave the first season an 8 out of 10, stating the season "is great, thanks to its unique action and strong character-centric gravitas" and that the show "combines familiar superhero tropes with unexpected gore and moving character dynamics, resulting in the year's most surprising superhero series." Alan Sepinwall from Rolling Stone stated: "As the series moves along, Kirkman and company begin introducing twists to what we think is the formula — perhaps too many. Even within three episodes, the number of reversals and secrets pile so high that it can be hard to invest in certain characters and scenes, rather than trying to guess what will come next." Roxana Hadadi from RogerEbert.com praised the series for its story and animation, commenting: "'Invincible' sets up those questions quickly and engagingly in these first three installments, wraps them in a mystery, and then splatters them with blood. It's not an entirely new approach for this genre, but the familiarity of 'Invincible' is forgivable in light of the confidence that both Kirkman and Yeun bring to the material. They're the reason to watch." Niv M. Sultan from Slant Magazine gave the first season 3.5 stars of 4, and commented "Invincible recaptures what our current glut of superhero fiction largely loses sight of: the pleasure that superheroes must feel when wielding their powers. Not the sacred satisfaction of helping the downtrodden, but the id-centered thrills of soaring through the sky and inflicting hurt on those deemed deserving." Louis Chilton from The Independent gave the series 3 stars of 5 and stated "Invincible often seems derivative; perhaps its ideas were more groundbreaking in the original early-2000s comics. Some of its characters are unapologetic parodies (the Batman facsimile “Darkwing”, for example), and you could easily go through picking out elements or story ideas that have cropped up in Watchmen, or The Incredibles, or Sky High, or Misfits. But there are still some good bones to its premise, and just enough subversiveness to let you ignore the fact this is a story you've seen a hundred times before."

Accolades

In other media
The series' eighth episode spawned a popular Internet meme called "Think, Mark, Think".

Controversy
Invincible creator Robert Kirkman was sued by comic book colorist William Crabtree, citing a rights and profits concern, on January 10, 2022.

References

External links

 

2021 American television series debuts
2020s American drama television series
2020s American adult animated television series
2020s American animated television series
2020s American LGBT-related animated television series
2020s adult animated television series
American adult animated action television series
American adult animated adventure television series
American adult animated drama television series
American adult animated science fiction television series
American adult animated superhero television series
Animated thriller television series
Amazon Prime Video original programming
Animated television series by Amazon Studios
Anime-influenced Western animated television series
Asian-American television
Coming-of-age television shows
English-language television shows
Film and television memes
Internet memes introduced in 2021
Invincible (comic)
Superhero television series
Teen animated television series
Television series based on Image Comics
Television series by Amazon Studios